Abbas Combe is a village in the civil parish of Abbas and Templecombe, in the South Somerset district, in the county of Somerset, England. It is situated on the A357 road beside Templecombe, seven miles south west of Gillingham. As of 2002 the parish of Abbas and Templecombe had a population of 1,510. The modern area now known as Abbas Combe is now considered more of a part of Templecombe. The border is fuzzy however it's mostly the areas of Templecombe located north of the Railway Station. Abbas Combe consists of a few buildings and structures such as a church, a resovoir, farm, War Memorial, and many other buildings. Other than those Abbas Combe is entirely residential.

Abbas Combe isn't served directly by any public transport routes but is right by Templecombe railway station.

Abbas Combe is recorded in the Domesday Book of 1086-7 as Cumbe, when it was held by the church of St Edward, Shaftesbury.

References 

Villages in South Somerset